The Golden Butterfly is a 2004 Khmer language romance film directed by Parn Puong Bopha. The film was distributed by Angkorwat Productions. It stars Suos Sotheara.

Cast
Suos Sotheara

Cambodian drama films
2004 films
2000s romance films